Spooning  or choreic hand is flexion and dorsal arching of the wrists and hyperextension of the fingers  when the hands are extended sideways palms down.

Spooning is a recognized clinical sign in pediatric neurology during standard evaluation of the posture with extended arms. Spooning is often observed in children up to the age of 5.

In older ages it is a clinical sign seen in children with chorea.

References

Neurology
Hand
Medical signs